Jaymon Crabb (born 6 March 1978) is a former professional tennis player from Australia.

He is the brother of Jaxon Crabb, who played for the West Coast Eagles and Port Adelaide in the Australian Football League.

Career
Crabb was a semi-finalist in the boys' singles event at the 1996 Wimbledon Championships and was junior winner of the Queen's Club Championships that year.

He made his first senior Grand Slam appearance in the 1997 Australian Open, where he was defeated in the opening round by Leander Paes. In 2002, he returned to the Australian Open and although he again exited in the first round, he did manage to take a set off a previous finalist, Marcelo Rios. The following year, he beat countryman Andrew Ilie in four sets to register his first win in the Australian Open. He was eliminated from the tournament in the second round by David Nalbandian. In each of his three appearances at the event, he also competed in the men's doubles, with different partners each time: Richard Fromberg, Todd Larkham and Peter Luczak. He also twice played Grand Slam mixed doubles, at both the Australian Open and Wimbledon in 2003, partnering his future wife Bryanne Stewart.

Challenger titles

Doubles: (3)

References

1978 births
Living people
Australian male tennis players
People from Bunbury, Western Australia
Tennis people from Western Australia
20th-century Australian people
21st-century Australian people